Lenin... The Train is an English-language TV film directed by Damiano Damiani in 1988. The film was released on 30 November 1988 by Rai 2.
It is based on Vladimir Lenin's journey from Switzerland  to Petrograd by sealed train through war time Germany during the Russian Revolution of 1917.

Lenin's role is played by British actor  Ben Kingsley. The film is two part 198 minutes.

The film was produced by  Rai 2 and Taurus Film in collaboration with Österreichischer Rundfunk (ORF),  Zweites Deutsches Fernsehen (ZDF) and Televisión Española (TVE).

Cast
Ben Kingsley  as  Lenin 
Leslie Caron    as   Nadezhda "Nadya" Krupskaya 
Dominique Sanda   as   Inessa Armand 
Timothy West  as  Alexander Parvus (Helphand) 
Peter Whitman  as   Karl Radek 
Xabier Elorriaga  as  Fritz Platten 
Jason Connery  as  David Suljashvili
Paolo Bonacelli  as   Grigory Zinoviev 
Wolfgang Gasser as Julius Martov
Mattia Sbragia  as Furstenberg 
Robin McCallum   as   Von Buhring  
Günther Maria Halmer  as   Von Planetz 
Dagmar Schwarz  as   Olga 
Verena Mayr   as   Clarissa 
Hans Kraemmer  as   Von Romberg
Alan Goodson as Georgy Safarov

References

External links

English-language television shows
Russian Revolution films
Biographical films about revolutionaries
Cultural depictions of Vladimir Lenin
German World War I films
Italian television films
English-language Italian films
West German films
German television films
English-language German films
Spanish television films
English-language Spanish films
French television films
English-language French films
Austrian television films
Films directed by Damiano Damiani
RTVE shows
ZDF original programming
Films set in 1917
Rail transport films
Films scored by Nicola Piovani